Xerocrassa pseudojacosta is a species of air-breathing land snail, a terrestrial pulmonate gastropod mollusk in the family Geomitridae, the hairy snails and their allies.

This species is endemic to Israel.

References

Trochoidea (genus)
Gastropods described in 1976
Taxonomy articles created by Polbot
Taxobox binomials not recognized by IUCN